Tommy McClendon, also known by his stage name, Atomik Tommy M, is a Japanese born American musician, best known for his work with UFO from 1984-1988.

Early life 
McClendon was born in Yokohama, Japan, and moved to Stockton, California when he was 10. A multi-instrumentalist, he began learning violin at the age of 5, piano at 10, and guitar at 13. McClendon's first band was formed when he was 15 with his brother, Dan. He graduated from Stockton's Lincoln High School in 1972. McClendon performed in multiple different bands before becoming a member of UFO. The members of the group were Deep Water, Thunderwing, and Boy Wonder, the latter of which inspired his "Atomik Tommy M" stage name. His early musical influences include The Beatles, The Lovin' Spoonful, Mance Lipscomb, and Paul Butterfield.

With UFO 
Before McClendon joined UFO, the band disbanded after its unsuccessful tour supporting Making Contact.  Phil Mogg spent time in Los Angeles, where he contacted, through Mike Varney, McClendon, asking him to be in a new band. This new band later ended up staying as UFO, and they released Misdemeanor
in 1985. They also released Ain't Misbehavin' in 1988 with McClendon.

After UFO 
McClendon was the guitarist for ex-Tesla bassist Brian Wheat's band Soulmotor, appearing on their first three releases. More recently, he was in the group When We Become Kings, which broke up in 2017. McClendon gives guitar lessons at The Music Box in Lodi, California.

Bands
SoulMotor (1999)- Guitars
Revolution Wheel (2002)- Guitars, Keyboards
UFO - As Atomik Tommy M (1984-1988) - Guitars

References

Living people
Year of birth missing (living people)